Notoglanidium macrostoma, also called the flatnose catfish and dwarf giraffe catfish is a species of claroteid catfish found in rivers in Angola, Cameroon, the Democratic Republic of the Congo, the Republic of the Congo and Gabon.  It is active during twilight and at night and its diet consists of small fishes, crustaceans and insect larvae.  It grows to a length of 24.0 cm (9.4 inches) TL.

References 

Claroteidae
Fish of Africa
Fish described in 1909